A. barbinervis may refer to:

Acacia barbinervis, a shrub species
Adelia barbinervis, a flowering plant species